Johnnie Lee Higgins (born September 8, 1983) is a former professional American football wide receiver.  Higgins played college football for the University of Texas at El Paso.  He was drafted by the Oakland Raiders in the third round (99th pick overall) in the 2007 NFL Draft, and has also played for the Philadelphia Eagles.

Early years
Higgins was born and raised in Sweeny and attended Sweeny High School in Sweeny, Texas, and was a student and a letterman in football, basketball, and track. In basketball, he was named his team's Most Valuable Player.

College career
Higgins attended the University of Texas at El Paso to play football for the Miners. He received several honors, including Conference USA Special Teams Player of the Year in 2006.

Professional career

Oakland Raiders
After turning in a 4.43 40-yard dash time at the 2007 NFL Scouting Combine, Higgins was selected by the Oakland Raiders in the third round (99th overall and the final pick of the first day) of the 2007 NFL Draft. He became the team's starting punt returner and he returned a punt 90 yards for a touchdown in a preseason game against the Seattle Seahawks on August 30, 2007. He saw action in all 16 games in the 2007 season, starting in two of them at wide receiver.

He saw punt return action in the first three games, but it was in week 4 against the Denver Broncos in which Higgins made his first NFL reception. He caught two passes for 14 yards in the game. On special teams, Higgins recorded five tackles. In his final game of the season, he had a punt return for 54 yards, which set up fellow rookie JaMarcus Russell to throw his second touchdown of the season. Higgins finished his rookie year with six receptions for 47 yards, 20 punt returns for 103 yards, and five special teams tackles.

In the 2008 season, Higgins recorded more receiving yards than any other Raider wide receiver (tight end Zach Miller led the team in yards).  He also returned punts for touchdowns in back-to-back games.

In the first game of the 2009 season, against San Diego, Higgins ran the ball one time for 19 yards.

Philadelphia Eagles
Higgins signed a one-year contract with the Philadelphia Eagles on July 29, 2011.
He was released by the team on September 3 during final roster cuts.

Personal
He is the cousin of NFL cornerback Quentin Jammer.

References

External links
Philadelphia Eagles bio
Oakland Raiders bio

Living people
1983 births
People from Brazoria County, Texas
American football wide receivers
UTEP Miners football players
Oakland Raiders players
American football return specialists
Philadelphia Eagles players